Al Park (born January 24, 1970) is an American attorney, lobbyist, and politician who served as a member of the New Mexico House of Representatives for the 26th district from 2001 to 2013.

Early life and education 
Park was born in the Panama Canal Zone, the son of a Venezuelan mother and white father. He earned a Bachelor of Arts degree in history from Purdue University in 1992 and a Juris Doctor from the George Washington University Law School in 1995.

Career 
From 1995 to 1997, Park served as a law clerk for Judge John Edwards Conway. He later worked as an attorney at Jennings Haug Keleher McLeod. He was elected to the New Mexico House of Representatives in November 2000 and assumed office in January 2001. During his tenure, Park served as chair of the House Judiciary Committee. Since leaving the House in 2013, Park has worked as a lobbyist and attorney.

References 

Living people
Purdue University alumni
George Washington University Law School alumni
New Mexico lawyers
Democratic Party members of the New Mexico House of Representatives
People from Albuquerque, New Mexico
Politicians from Albuquerque, New Mexico
American lobbyists
1970 births